The Delaware United States House election for 1794 was held on October 4, 1794.  The current Representative Henry Latimer was defeated after a rematch with John Patten.

Results

References

Delaware
1794
1794 Delaware elections